Tomas Peyniri (also called Serto) or Karın kaymağı (cream of belly) is the name of a Turkish cheese traditionally made of sheep's milk and goat milk.  Tomas cheese which is among the cheeses produced in Tulum in Eastern Anatolia Region took its name from the word of tomas which means in Greek as leather.

Tomas cheese by location

Erzurum karın kaymağı peyniri 
Kars karın kaymağı peyniri
Dorak peyniri

See also
 Turkish cuisine

References

Sheep's-milk cheeses
Goat's-milk cheeses
Turkish cheeses